Time in Zimbabwe is given by a single time zone, officially denoted as Central Africa Time (CAT; UTC+02:00). Zimbabwe has never observed daylight saving time. Zimbabwe, as Southern Rhodesia, has observed CAT since 1903.

IANA time zone database 
In the IANA time zone database, Zimbabwe is given one zone in the file zone.tab – Africa/Harare. "ZW" refers to the country's ISO 3166-1 alpha-2 country code. Data for Zimbabwe directly from zone.tab of the IANA time zone database; columns marked with * are the columns from zone.tab itself:

See also 
List of time zones by country
List of UTC time offsets

References

External links 
Current time in Zimbabwe at Time.is
Time in Zimbabwe at TimeAndDate.com

Time in Zimbabwe